Bong-Ho Son (born 1938) is a South Korean Christian ethics scholar and social activist. He then studied theology at Westminster Theological Seminary in the United States, and received his Ph.D from Vrije Universiteit Amsterdam in the Netherlands. He has taught at the Hankuk University of Foreign Studies and Seoul National University, and has served as president of Hansung University and of Dongduk Women's University. In 2011, he established the Sharing National Movement Headquarters, where he is in charge of representation. He is working in the field of the Christian Ethics Movement of Korea.

References

External links
 Sharing National Movement Headquarters
 "To create a transparent and fair society"
 A RESPONSE TO BONG HO SON
 Bongho Son, Profile
 The Restoration of Identification of Korea Church

1938 births
Living people
Academic staff of Hankuk University of Foreign Studies
Seoul National University alumni
Academic staff of Seoul National University
South Korean expatriates in the Netherlands
South Korean philosophers
Vrije Universiteit Amsterdam alumni
Westminster Theological Seminary alumni
Academic staff of Hansung University